Teodoro José Tirado García (born 16 July 1985 in Madrid), commonly known as Teo, is a Spanish professional footballer who plays as a right or left winger.

References

External links

1985 births
Living people
Footballers from Madrid
Spanish footballers
Association football wingers
Segunda División players
Segunda División B players
Tercera División players
Villarreal CF B players
Real Valladolid Promesas players
Real Valladolid players
FC Cartagena footballers
SD Ponferradina players
Águilas CF players
Pontevedra CF footballers
Orihuela CF players
Real Oviedo players
SD Amorebieta footballers
CP Cacereño players
CD Ebro players
CE L'Hospitalet players
1. deild karla players
Selfoss men's football players
Spanish expatriate footballers
Expatriate footballers in Iceland
Spanish expatriate sportspeople in Iceland